The Bitzer's Mill Covered Bridge is a covered bridge that spans the Conestoga River in Lancaster County, Pennsylvania, United States.  It is the oldest bridge in the county still in use.  A county-owned and maintained bridge, its official designation is the Big Conestoga #2 Bridge.  The bridge is also called Martin's Mill Bridge, Eberly's Cider Mill Covered Bridge, and Fiand's/Fiantz's Covered Bridge.

The bridge has a single span, wooden, double Burr arch trusses design with the addition of steel hanger rods.  The deck is made from oak planks. Added later, secondary steel I-beams support the bridge from underneath.  The bridge is painted red on the outside, the traditional color of Lancaster County covered bridges.  The inside of the bridge is not painted.  Both approaches to the bridge are painted in the traditional white color.  As of July 2006, the bridge has some damage to its sides including some missing or broken panels.

The bridge's WGCB Number is 38-36-04. In 1980 it was added to the National Register of Historic Places as structure number 80003516. It is located at  (40.1405, -76.1520) near the junction of U.S. Route 222 and U.S. Route 322 southeast of Ephrata in West Earl Township. A left onto Cider Mill Road leads straight to the bridge, which is visible from the intersection.

History 
The bridge was built in 1846 by George Fink and Sam Reamsnyder at a cost of $1,115.  They used a single span, wooden, double Burr arch truss construction.  At some point later, steel I-beams were installed under the floor to add support to the oldest bridge in Lancaster County.  The bridge has historically been referred to by a number of names that reflected the various mill owners. In 1962, it was proposed to replace the bridge with a concrete span, but the plan was discontinued after much public outcry.

See also
List of covered bridges on the National Register of Historic Places in Pennsylvania
List of covered bridges in Lancaster County, Pennsylvania
List of crossings of the Conestoga River
National Register of Historic Places listings in Lancaster County, Pennsylvania

References 

Bridges completed in 1846
Covered bridges on the National Register of Historic Places in Pennsylvania
Covered bridges in Lancaster County, Pennsylvania
Bridges over the Conestoga River
National Register of Historic Places in Lancaster County, Pennsylvania
Road bridges on the National Register of Historic Places in Pennsylvania
Wooden bridges in Pennsylvania
Burr Truss bridges in the United States